Veronika Decides to Die is a 2009 American psychological drama film directed by Emily Young from a screenplay by Roberta Hanley and Larry Gross, based on the 1998 novel of the same name by Paulo Coelho. It stars Sarah Michelle Gellar in the title role, with Jonathan Tucker, Florencia Lozano, Melissa Leo, David Thewlis, and Erika Christensen appearing as supporting characters. While the novel originally takes place in Ljubljana, Slovenia, the film is set in New York City.

Plot
Despite a seemingly successful life, 30-something Veronika Deklava is depressed and cannot find meaning in her existence. Intending suicide, she takes an overdose, blaming her attempted suicide on the failure of the world to recognize what is "real". She wakes inside an exclusive and expensive mental asylum only to learn that the overdose has left her prone to an aneurysm that will kill her in a matter of weeks.

At first, Veronika wants only to accelerate the process, and even a visit by her adoptive parents fails to rekindle her will to live. Her parents love her, but while they are prepared to spend their dwindling resources to get her what help they can (not knowing her death is imminent anyway), they do not truly understand her. They discouraged her from accepting a full musical scholarship at Juilliard because they wanted her to get a degree that could earn her a living. They do not see how she despairs at their constraints.

In spite of herself and in spite of her disappointment with her materialistic life, Veronika finds renewed purpose through playing the asylum's piano and through observing and then connecting with the schizophrenic Edward. Not only does she recover her own will to live, Veronika helps bring Edward out of his catatonic state, and the pair soon "escape" (Dr. Blake, looking out his window, observes them escaping, but does not send for anyone to bring them back) from the asylum together, determined to enjoy Veronika's final days as a couple.

Veronika does not know that her aneurysm is the invention of her unorthodox psychiatrist Dr. Blake, who is testing his theory that convincing her she has only weeks to live will restore her to health and cure her desire to commit suicide. He explains his treatment through letter to his estranged wife, a colleague from the asylum. As long as she does not know the truth, he theorizes, she will consider each day as if it might be her last and thus treasure it. This is, he notes, actually true, as nobody knows when their end will come.

When Veronika drifts off one morning on a bench at sunrise, Edward believes he has lost her, but his grief transforms to joy when she wakes. Celebrating what they believe might be one more day, the pair embrace and walk happily on the beach in the morning light, laughing and holding hands.

Cast
 Sarah Michelle Gellar as Veronika Deklava
 Jonathan Tucker as Edward
 Erika Christensen as Claire
Florencia Lozano as Dr. Thompson
 Melissa Leo as Mari
 David Thewlis as Dr. Blake
 Adrian Martinez as male nurse #1

Production
Both Lindsay Lohan and Kate Bosworth were previously attached to the project. Gellar was ultimately cast in the title role. 

Gillian Anderson and Katherine Fugate had tried to produce a version of this film but lost out on the bid to produce it. Eventually, the novel was adapted for film by Muse Productions, Das Films, and Velvet Steamroller Entertainment.

Shooting for the film began on May 12, 2008, in New York City and concluded on June 21.

Release
Veronika Decides to Die had a special screening in Brazil on August 7, 2009, followed by an August 21 release. The film was released in Poland and Sweden in October 2009, in South Korea on November 19, 2009, in Lithuania on April 23, 2010, in Argentina on July 1, 2010, and in Mexico and Germany in September 2010. In Australia, it was released on a region-free PAL DVD. It was never officially released in the United Kingdom.

In the United States, the film was released by Entertainment One Films in select theaters and on VOD on January 20, 2015, and on DVD on March 17, 2015. The film was made available on Netflix the same year.

References

External links
 

2009 films
2009 drama films
2000s psychological drama films
American psychological drama films
Films about depression
Films about suicide
Films based on Brazilian novels
Films directed by Emily Young
Films set in New York City
Films set in psychiatric hospitals
Films shot in New York City
2000s English-language films
2000s American films